Henry James Cannon (11 July 1897 – 16 March 1944) was an Irish football player during the 1920s and 1930s.

Bohemians
Cannon was a goalkeeper during this era in the League of Ireland and spent most of his career with Bohemians. He captained the All-Conquering Bohemians team of 1927/28 who won every trophy on offer that season - League of Ireland, FAI Cup, League of Ireland Shield and Leinster Senior Cup. Harry spent the best part of a decade with Bohs picking up numerous medals along the way. Cannon was also an occasional penalty taker for Bohemians, scoring three times in his career from the penalty spot. After retirement, Harry had a spell on the Bohemian F.C. Management Committee.

International
He won full international caps for Irish Free State against Italy in March 1926. This side also included Bohemian colleague Jack McCarthy. He was also part of the side that recorded defeated Belgium in February 1928.

Other
An accomplished cricketer at club level, Cannon captained Civil Service Cricket Club for a time. Harry also kept goal for the Railway Union field hockey team. He also led the Irish Olympic Team as chef de mission at the 1932 Summer Olympics in Los Angeles. Cannon was a career soldier in the Irish Army attaining the rank of captain.

Honours
League of Ireland: 4
 Bohemians - 1927/28, 1929/30, 1933/34, 1935/36
FAI Cup: 2
 Bohemians - 1928, 1935
League of Ireland Shield: 3
 Bohemians - 1928, 1929, 1934,
Full International Caps for Ireland

References

External links

Republic of Ireland association footballers
Irish Free State international footballers
League of Ireland players
Bohemian F.C. players
Irish male field hockey players
Railway Union field hockey players
Association football goalkeepers
Association footballers from County Donegal
Male field hockey goalkeepers
1897 births
1944 deaths
Irish Army officers